Elekistra (Greek: Ελεκίστρα, also Ελικίστρα) is a village and a community in the municipality of Patras, Achaea, Greece. It is situated in the foothills of the Panachaiko mountain, southeast of the built-up area of Patras, about 7 km from the city centre. The community consists of the villages Elekistra, Karya, Pournarokastro, Ryaki and Romanos. In 2011 Elekistra had a population of 275 for the village and 1,538 for the community.

Population

External links
 Elekistra GTP Travel Pages

See also

List of settlements in Achaea

References

Patras
Populated places in Achaea